Beor may refer to:

 Beor (biblical figure), father of the prophet Balaam
 Beor (village), a village in Punjab, Pakistan
 Henry Beor (1846–1880), politician in colonial Queensland, Australia

See also
 Boer (surname)